Stanley Henry Kunz (September 26, 1864 – April 23, 1946) was an American politician who served 6 terms a Democratic U.S. Representative from Illinois from 1921 to 1933.

Early life and education 
Born in Nanticoke, Pennsylvania, Kunz attended the public schools, St. Ignatius College (Now known as Loyola University Chicago) in Chicago, Illinois.

Career 
He served as member of the State house of representatives 1888-1890.
He served in the State senate 1902-1906.
He served as member of the Chicago City council 1891-1921.
He served as member of the Democratic county central committee of Cook County 1891-1925.
He engaged in the breeding of thoroughbreds and racing horses in Palatine, Illinois from 1910 to 1933.
He served as delegate to the Democratic National Conventions in 1912, 1916, and 1924.

Congress 
Kunz was elected as a Democrat to the Sixty-seventh and to the four succeeding Congresses (March 4, 1921 – March 3, 1931).
He successfully contested the election of Peter C. Granata to the Seventy-second Congress and served from April 5, 1932, to March 3, 1933.
He was an unsuccessful candidate for renomination in 1932.

Death
He lived in Chicago, Illinois, until his death there on April 23, 1946.
He was interred in St. Adalbert's Cemetery.

References

1864 births
1946 deaths
People from Nanticoke, Pennsylvania
Loyola University Chicago alumni
American politicians of Polish descent
Democratic Party members of the Illinois House of Representatives
Democratic Party Illinois state senators
Chicago City Council members
Democratic Party members of the United States House of Representatives from Illinois